Kirill Tsulygin (born March 1, 1996) is a Russian professional ice hockey forward who currently plays for the Zauralie Kurgan of the Supreme Hockey League (VHL).

Tsulygin made his Kontinental Hockey League (KHL) debut playing with Salavat Yulaev Ufa during the 2015–16 KHL season.

References

External links

1996 births
Living people
Dizel Penza players
Salavat Yulaev Ufa players
Russian ice hockey defencemen
Sportspeople from Ufa
Tolpar Ufa players
Toros Neftekamsk players
Zauralie Kurgan players